The Kangan is a class of auxiliary water tanker (AWT) operated by the Islamic Republic of Iran Navy. The class includes two pairs of ships built by the Mazagon Dock during 1978–1979 and 1991–1992.

Ships in the class
Known ships in commission the class are:

According to the Jane's Fighting Ships, it is unknown whether the second pair including Shahid Marjani and Amir are in naval service and the source comments that the two may be in civilian use. However, International Institute of Strategic Studies (IISS) reports indicate that all four are in military use.

See also

 List of tankers
 List of naval ship classes of Iran
 List of naval ship classes in service

References

External links 
 Kangan AWT at GlobalSecurity.org

Auxiliary ships of the Islamic Republic of Iran Navy
Ship classes of the Islamic Republic of Iran Navy
Tankers
Ships built in Bombay